The Cambrian, a weekly newspaper started by George Haynes and L. W. Dillwyn in 1804, was the first newspaper published in Wales. Its original publisher was Thomas Jenkins. The full masthead proclaimed The Cambrian and Weekly General Advertiser for Swansea and the Principality of Wales. By 1906 it was acquired by South Wales Post Newspapers Co. and, in 1930, merged with Herald of Wales.
Many articles in this newspaper have been indexed and the index is searchable at https://archive.swansea.gov.uk/cambrian

References

Newspapers published in Wales
Publications established in 1804
1804 establishments in Wales
Publications disestablished in 1930
1930 disestablishments in Wales